Parectopa bumeliella is a moth of the family Gracillariidae. It is known from Kentucky and Arkansas in the United States. It was described by Annette Frances Braun in 1939.

The host plants for the species include Sideroxylon lanuginosum and Sideroxylon lycioides. They mine the leaves of their host plant.

References

Gracillariinae